Senjedpur (also Romanized as Senjedpūr; also known as Senjed Būr) is a village in Bala Velayat Rural District, in the Central District of Torbat-e Heydarieh County, Razavi Khorasan Province, Iran. At the 2006 census, its population was 139, in 38 families.

References 

Populated places in Torbat-e Heydarieh County